Aryn may refer to:

 Aryn, the name in the Meadow Mari language of Arino, a village in Morkinsky District, Mari El Republic, Russia
 Aryn Baker (born before 1991), American journalist
 Aryn Kyle (born 1978), American novelist and short story writer
 Aryn Michelle (Aryn Michelle Calhoun, born 1983), American Christian musician
 Aryn Williams (born 1993), Australian professional footballer

See also
 Ariño, a municipality located in the province of Teruel, Aragon, Spain
 Arin (disambiguation)
 Aryan (disambiguation)